The Roe–Parker House is a historic house in Hood River, Oregon, United States.

The house was listed on the National Register of Historic Places in 1988. It was relocated from its original site adjacent to the Hood River Library in 2002, to make way for expansion of the library building. It was removed from the National Register in 2018.

See also
National Register of Historic Places listings in Hood River County, Oregon

Notes

References

External links

1900 establishments in Oregon
Former National Register of Historic Places in Oregon
Houses completed in 1900
Houses in Hood River County, Oregon
Houses on the National Register of Historic Places in Oregon
National Register of Historic Places in Hood River County, Oregon
Queen Anne architecture in Oregon
Relocated buildings and structures in Oregon
Stick-Eastlake architecture in Oregon